The men's 50 kilometre cross-country skiing competition at the 1976 Winter Olympics in Innsbruck, Austria, was held on Saturday 14 February at Seefeld. Gerhard Grimmer of East Germany was the 1974 World champion and Pål Tyldum of Norway was the defending champion from the 1972 Olympics in Sapporo, Japan.

Each skier started at half a minute intervals, skiing the entire 50 kilometre course. Of the 59 athletes who started the race, 15 did not finish. Ivar Formo of Norway took his first and only Olympic gold medal.

Results
Sources:

References

External links
 Final results (International Ski Federation)

Men's cross-country skiing at the 1976 Winter Olympics
Men's 50 kilometre cross-country skiing at the Winter Olympics